Pajusi was a rural municipality of Estonia, in Jõgeva County. It had a population of 1,623 (2003) and an area of 232.4 km².

Villages
Pajusi Parish had 23 villages:
Aidu, Arisvere, Kaave, Kalana, Kauru, Kose, Kõpu, Kõrkküla, Lahavere, Loopre, Luige, Mõisaküla, Mõrtsi, Nurga, Pajusi, Pisisaare, Sopimetsa, Tapiku, Tõivere, Uuevälja, Vorsti, Vägari, Väljataguse.

See also
Endla Nature Reserve

References

External links